The 1998 AFF Championship qualification phase was co-hosted by Myanmar and Singapore from 14 to 18 March 1998 and 24 to 28 March 1998 respectively.  There are three teams per group and the top two teams of each group qualify for the final tournament.

Venues

Qualification

Qualification Group A 
Matches played in Myanmar.

Qualification Group B 
Matches played in Singapore.

Qualified Teams

Teams who finished Top 2 of the 2 groups will qualify to the main tournament.

References 
 Courtney, Barrie. "1998 Tiger Cup overview". RSSSF. Retrieved 2 March 2010.

External links
 Tiger Cup 1998 at AseanFootball.org

Qual
AFF Championship
AFF Championship
1998
1998